The following highways are numbered 444:

Australia 

  Wilsons Promontory Road

Canada
Manitoba Provincial Road 444

Japan
 Japan National Route 444

United States
  Interstate 444 (unsigned)
  Louisiana Highway 444
  Maryland Route 444
  Montana Secondary Highway 444
  Nevada State Route 444
  New Jersey Route 444 (unsigned designation for the Garden State Parkway)
 New Jersey Route 444R
 New Jersey Route 444S
  New York State Route 444
  Ohio State Route 444
 Ohio State Route 444A (former)
  Puerto Rico Highway 444
  Tennessee State Route 444